Jinning District is one of seven districts of the prefecture-level city of Kunming, the capital of Yunnan Province, Southwest China. The formation of the district was approved on November 24, 2016, after the dissolution of the former Jinning County by the State Council. It is located at the southern tip of Dian Lake and is well known within China as the birthplace of Zheng He.

Nature 
The southwestern "panhandle" of Jinning District (Xiyang Township) contains two caves (Yanzi and Shitou) known for their bat population. Starting from the early 2010s, researchers from the Wuhan Institute of Virology and EcoHealth Alliance carried out studies of viruses carried by those bats, discovering some that were fairly close to the Severe acute respiratory syndrome coronavirus. A 2018 study found antibodies to some of these bat viruses in the blood of a few villagers residing near the bat caves as well, indicating that some of them may have been exposed to bat coronaviruses.

History 
In 303 CE, during the Jin dynasty, Li Xiu became commander of the area after the abrupt death of her father, defeating a local rebellion after lasting a seven-year siege.

Administrative divisions
Kunyang Town, Jincheng Town and Baofeng Town, Erjie Village, Shuanghe Yi Nationality Village, Xiyang Yi Nationality Village, Shangsuan Village, Xinjie Village and Lujie Village

Ethnic groups
According to the Kunming City Almanac (1997:476), ethnic Hani are found in Gaoliangdi and Xiyang of Xiyang Yi Ethnic Township, Jinning County.

Climate

Transport 
China National Highway 213

Social issues
In October 2014, Fuyou village was the scene of a violent clash between construction workers and villagers, leading to the deaths of eight people. The residents had been unhappy about a land deal related to the building of a trade and logistics centre.

Monuments

The Shizhaishan Tombs (Shizhaishan gumuqun 石寨山古墓群), and the grave of Ma station Hazhi (Ma Hazhi mubei 马哈只墓碑) in the greater community Kunyang, the father of Zheng He, are since 2001 and 2006 respectively on the list the monuments of the People's Republic of China.

References 

 Area Code and Postal Code in Yunnan Province

External links 
jinning.gov.cn - official
 Master mariner's genealogy comes to light
 Zheng He's pedigree
 Cheng Ho went around the world in 28 years
 Zhenghe Park
 Zheng He gongyuan

County-level divisions of Kunming